Problematique may refer to:

Problématique (album), an unreleased album by Kim Petras
Problematique, a type of research question